Biccari is a town and comune in the province of Foggia in the Apulia region of southeast Italy.

Main sights
 Historic centre
 Byzantine tower of Biccari
 Tower Tertiveri
 Church of the Assumption of the Blessed Virgin Mary
 Convent of St. Anthony (1477) 
 Church of the Annunciation
 Romanesque and Gothic church of San Quirico
 Cross roads of Port Wells (1473)
 Portal medieval Gallo Palace (Piazza Don Luigi Sturzo)
 Wooden altar carved and decorated in gold St. Michael (18th century)
 800 Godfrey Palace with its majestic facades
 Fortified farms of Santa Maria and Imporchia
 Palazzo Pignatelli di Tertiveri
 Pescara Lake

People 
 Ralph DePalma (Biccari, 1882 – South Pasadena, 1956), American race car driver

See also 

 Biccari Wikipedia page in Italian

References

External links 
 Official website

Cities and towns in Apulia